The Darwin Waterfront Precinct is a tourist area in the Northern Territory of Australia in Darwin City.  Restaurants, bars, a wave pool and a man-made beach are available for local community and tourists. It is located five minutes’ walk from the Darwin Central Business District (CBD).

Location/Geography 
The Darwin Waterfront Precinct is located on Wharf One and Two.

History 
The Waterfront Precinct is built on reclaimed land from Kitchener  Bay between Stokes Hill and Fort Hill (which has since been removed).

The Darwin Oil Storage Tunnels were built during World War II to protect the navy's oil from attack by the Japanese. Two of these tunnels are now open to the public.

Darwin Waterfront Corporation
The Darwin Waterfront Precinct is managed by the Darwin Waterfront Corporation, a corporation created by act of parliament in 2006.  Its role is to manage and promote the precinct.  The corporation also responsible for the provision of municipal services to the precinct.

Tourist Attractions 
Waterfront Lagoon

Goyder Park

Deckchair Cinema

Darwin Wave Pool

Darwin Convention Centre

Restaurants, Shops and Apartments

References

External links
Darwin Waterfront Precinct official website

Tourist attractions in Darwin, Northern Territory
Water parks in Australia
Unincorporated areas of the Northern Territory